The Battle of Cartagena in 209 BC was a successful Roman assault on the Carthaginian stronghold New Carthage (Cartagena) in Iberia that took place in late January to early February of 209 BC.

Geography

New Carthage was a town situated within the Iberian peninsula – joined to the mainland to the east by a narrow isthmus. On the north side the town was protected by a large lagoon, which fed into a canal which protected the west side of the town. On the south side of the town, there was the Bay of Cartagena. As a result of this geography, New Carthage benefited from a geography that made it very difficult to assault.

Background

The Roman commander Publius Cornelius Scipio Africanus sailed to Spain (Iberia) in middle 210 BC, and spent the early part of the winter organizing his army (the total force in Spain was approximately 30,000 men) and planning his assault on New Carthage.

Opposing him were the three Carthaginian generals (Hasdrubal Barca, Mago Barca and Hasdrubal Gisco), who were on bad terms with each other, geographically scattered (Hasdrubal Barca in central Spain, Mago near Gibraltar and Hasdrubal near the mouth of the Tagus river), and at least 10 days away from New Carthage.  The Roman campaign was conducted in winter to capture new Carthage using the element of surprise.

Livy mentions that the city garrison comprised 1,000 Carthaginian soldiers under the command of a certain Mago (not to be confused with the aforementioned Mago Barca), who picked out a further 2,000 men from the city to defend the front gate and be ready for a sally, and an unspecified amount of townsmen to watch for sudden emergencies.

Battle

Setting up camp across the isthmus with 27,500 men, Scipio isolated the town on the landward side, and with the Roman fleet (commanded by Gaius Laelius) blockading the town from the sea, the town was isolated from outside help. The Romans did not set up lines of circumvallation, intending to take the city by storm before help could arrive from the Carthaginian armies that were only 10 days away.

The 2,000 Carthaginian armed citizens launched a sortie through the narrow east gate of the city. Their purpose was to delay the progress of Roman siege works or assaults. They got close to the Roman camp, where Scipio had been expecting such an attack. Despite possessing every advantage over the Carthaginians in numbers, training, weapons, and leadership, the Romans had to fight hard and long against the skilled militia. Scipio fed in more maniples to the battle from his reserve and the Carthaginians broke and fled back to the city.

Scipio launched an assault over the isthmus, while the fleet attacked from the southern side. A hail of Carthaginian missiles beat back every Roman assault with heavy casualties. Scipio renewed the attack later in the day, with the addition of a party attacking through the lagoon on the northern side. Aided by a wind squall (which drained some of the lagoon into the Mediterranean, reducing the depth of the lagoon so the Roman troops could easily cross it), the party managed to scale the undefended northern wall and attacked the rear of the defenders defending the isthmus. At the same time, the naval forces managed to penetrate the town from the south.

Polybius gives a description of how Scipio Africanus stormed New Carthage:

The massacre was halted when Mago agreed to surrender, after which the Romans sacked the city.

Aftermath

With the fall of New Carthage, the Romans forced the Carthaginians to surrender the entire eastern coast of Spain, as well as capturing a large amount of military stores and the silver mines located nearby.

Footnotes

References

 
 
 Titus Livy, Ab urbe condita libri, Book XXVI, Chapters 41 through 51

209 BC
Ancient history of the Iberian Peninsula
Cartagena (209 BC)
Cartagena (209)
Cartagena
History of Cartagena, Spain
Battles involving the Roman Republic